Games Road is a road in Cockfosters, London, that runs from Chalk Road in the east into Monken Hadley Common in the west. The road falls into the Monken Hadley Conservation Area.

History and character
The road was originally part of an ancient bridleway that ran from Cockfosters to Monken Hadley. Gates halfway down Games Road mark the transition from public road to land that is part of the Common and Games Road continues westwards onto the common as a single track tarmacked way, the border of the Common being marked by white posts. The gates are grade II listed by Historic England.

Buildings

Three cottages (1750) adjacent to the white gates are locally listed with the London Borough of Barnet.

Ludgrove Hall, a former private home, then a school, now flats, is located at the western end of Games Road on the south side.

Pathways
In addition to pathways on the Common, the London Loop passes along Games Road.

References

External links 

Cockfosters
Monken Hadley
Streets in the London Borough of Barnet